German submarine U-67 was a Type IXC U-boat of Nazi Germany's Kriegsmarine that operated in World War II. She was laid down in the AG Weser yard in Bremen as yard number 986 on 5 April 1940. She was launched on 30 October and was commissioned  on 22 January 1941 under Korvettenkapitän Heinrich Bleichrodt.

Her service life began with training with the 2nd U-boat Flotilla on her commissioning date; the boat was declared operational with the same flotilla on 1 September 1941.

Design
German Type IXC submarines were slightly larger than the original Type IXBs. U-67 had a displacement of  when at the surface and  while submerged. She had two shafts and two  propellers.

U-67 was fitted with six  torpedo tubes (four fitted at the bow and two at the stern), 22 torpedoes, one  SK C/32 naval gun, 180 rounds, and a  SK C/30 as well as a  C/30 anti-aircraft gun. The boat had a complement of forty-eight.

Service history

The boat carried out seven patrols in which she sank 13 ships for a total of 72,138 GRT and damaged another five for a total of 29,726 GRT. She was a member of three wolfpacks.

She was sunk on 16 July 1943 by an Avenger bomber from the US aircraft carrier USS Core. 48 men died, there were three survivors.

Her operational service commenced with a trip from Bergen in Norway to Lorient in France. The submarine was to spend the rest of her career being based in the French port.

First, second and third patrols
She sank St. Clair II west northwest of the Canary Islands on 24 September 1941 on her first foray. On 28 September she was damaged in an action in Tarrafal Bay, Cape Verde islands, colliding with HMS Clyde, which forced her to return to base.

On her second patrol she was attacked by the British corvette  on 11 December 1941 west of Gibraltar; slight damage was incurred.  was originally thought to have been sunk.

Fourth, fifth and sixth patrols and loss
Her fourth patrol, as part of Operation Drumbeat, saw the submarine enter the Gulf of Mexico. There she sank eight ships, most of them just off the mouth of the Mississippi River.

Her fifth sortie turned out to be her longest - 97 days. Moving to the area off the north coast of South America, she sank a further six ships, but her success was marred by an explosion while handling torpedoes. One man was killed.

Patrol number six included being part of wolfpack Seeräuber ("Pirate") which was unfortunate as the boat was badly damaged in an attack on the convoy RS 3. Three U-boats (from a total of eight) were hit in the battle, which took place south of the Canary Islands.

The submarine began her seventh and final patrol on 10 May 1943. On 16 July, U-67 was spotted by a Grumman TBF Avenger, piloted by Lt. Robert Pershing Williams of VC-13 embarked in USS Core, who attacked with four Mk.7 depth charges, sinking the boat. An escort, was dispatched to the scene and picked up three survivors out of a crew of 51 in position .

Wolfpacks
U-67 took part in three wolfpacks, namely:
 Seeräuber (14 – 23 December 1941) 
 Wohlgemut (12 – 22 March 1943) 
 Seeräuber (25 – 30 March 1943)

Summary of raiding history

References

Bibliography

External links

German Type IX submarines
U-boats commissioned in 1941
U-boats sunk in 1943
World War II submarines of Germany
World War II shipwrecks in the Atlantic Ocean
1940 ships
Ships built in Bremen (state)
U-boats sunk by US aircraft
U-boats sunk by depth charges
Maritime incidents in July 1943